Srednja Slatina is a village in the municipality of Šamac, Bosnia and Herzegovina.

References

Populated places in Šamac, Bosnia and Herzegovina
Villages in Republika Srpska